Mulipola Anarosa Ale Molioo (born ~1968) is a Samoan politician and Cabinet Minister. She is the first woman ever appointed finance minister of Samoa. She is a member of the FAST Party.

Mulipola is from the village of Siutu and was active in bringing gender-equality to her village council. She previously worked as an auditor and deputy country manager for Western Union. She was first elected to the Legislative Assembly of Samoa in the 2021 Samoan general election. On 24 May 2021 she was appointed Minister of Finance in the elected cabinet of Fiamē Naomi Mataʻafa. The appointment was disputed by the caretaker government. On 23 July 2021 the Court of Appeal ruled that the swearing-in ceremony was constitutional and binding, and that FAST had been the government since 24 May.

In August 2021 in response to opposition claims that she had sought advice from New Zealand on an upcoming budget, Mulipola suggested that she lacked confidence in Ministry of Finance chief executive Leasiosiofa’asisina Oscar Malielegaoi, opposition leader Tuila'epa Sa'ilele Malielegaoi's son, as his family connection to the opposition created a perceived conflict of interest. On 27 August Mulipola called reports that Malielegaoi had been fired "misinformation". The next day Malielegaoi resigned, saying that the Minister had demanded his resignation. On 28 August Mulipola issued a statement saying that Malielegaoi's conflict of interest was not sustainable and that she had "reluctantly decided to accept his resignation".

Notes

References

|-

Living people
Members of the Legislative Assembly of Samoa
Women government ministers of Samoa
Finance ministers of Samoa
Faʻatuatua i le Atua Samoa ua Tasi politicians
Samoan civil servants
Year of birth missing (living people)
People from Palauli